Archiereus (Russian, arkhierei) is a Greek term for diocesan bishop, when considered as the culmination of the priesthood. It is used in the liturgical books of the Eastern Orthodox Church and Eastern Catholic Church, for those services which correspond to the pontifical services of the Roman Rite. The term is distinct from protoiereus (archpriest), the highest ecclesiastical rank which a married priest may attain in the Greek Church.

The word is used in the New Testament Epistle to the Hebrews to mean "high priest" (Heb 2:17; 3:1; 4:14,15; 5:1,5,10; 6:20; 7:26,27,28; 8:1,3; 9:7,11,25; 19:11; 13:11).

References

Byzantine Rite
Christian terminology